M-73 is a north–south state trunkline highway in the Upper Peninsula of the US state of Michigan. It connects with US Highway 2 (US 2) and Highway 55 (WIS 55) at the state line near Iron River. Running through forest, the highway was first designated along with the rest of the state highway system in 1919. Unchanged since its inception, M-73 was completely paved by the mid-1930s.

Route description

M-73 starts on its southwestern end on a bridge over the Brule River that connects across the state line to WIS 55 in Forest County, Wisconsin. On the Michigan side of the border, the highway runs north away from the river. It runs along the western edge of a section of farm fields before turning eastward to run through them. M-73 passes to the south of Hagerman, Little Hagerman and Bass lakes, after which it turns northeasterly running north of Stanley Lake. The northern terminus is at US 2 west of downtown Iron River. All of M-73 is two-lane rural highway through wooded terrain except the section immediately north of the state line which runs along the aforementioned farm.

No part of M-73 is listed on the National Highway System. In 2009, the Michigan Department of Transportation conducted a survey to determine the traffic volume along the highway, reported using a metric called average annual daily traffic. The department determined that 890 vehicles a day used the southern half of the highway while 1,100 vehicles used the northern section closest to US 2. In the same surveys, MDOT calculated that, on average, 30 trucks used the roadway daily.

History
M-73 was designated by July 1, 1919, along with the rest of the initial state trunkline highway system. In 1937, the highway was completely hard-surfaced for the first time. Its routing has been largely unchanged since designation. The original bridge over the Brule River was built in 1922. In a joint project with the Wisconsin Department of Transportation (WisDOT), MDOT funded a replacement in 2003. WisDOT supervised construction of the new span in a project that ran between July 14 and November 4, 2003.

Major intersections

See also

References

External links

M-73 at Michigan Highways

073
Transportation in Iron County, Michigan